The 1993 Challenge Bell was a tennis tournament played on indoor carpet courts at the Club Avantage Multi-Sports in Quebec City in Canada that was part of Tier III of the 1993 WTA Tour. It was the 1st edition of the Challenge Bell, and was held from November 1 through November 7, 1993. Nathalie Tauziat won the singles title.

Champions

Singles

 Nathalie Tauziat def.  Katerina Maleeva, 6–4, 6–1
It was Tauziat's only title of the year and the 2nd of her career.

Doubles

 Katrina Adams /  Manon Bollegraf def.  Katerina Maleeva /  Nathalie Tauziat, 6–4, 6–4
It was Adam's 3rd title of the year and the 16th of her career. It was Bollegraf's 2nd title of the year and the 11th of her career.

External links
Official website

Challenge Bell
Tournoi de Québec
Challenge Bell
1990s in Quebec City